Karla Prodan (born 29 August 1998) is a Croatian judoka. She won one of the bronze medals in the women's 78 kg event at the 2020 European Judo Championships held in Prague, Czech Republic. She competed in the women's 78 kg event at the 2020 Summer Olympics in Tokyo, Japan.

Career
In 2019, she competed in the women's 78 kg event at the World Judo Championships held in Tokyo, Japan where she was eliminated in her first match by Ma Zhenzhao of China. She won gold medal in her event at the 2015 World Cadet Judo Championship in Sarajevo, Bosnia and Hercegovina as well as silver medal at the 2018 World Junior Judo Championship in Nassau, Bahamas. She also holds two bronze medals in European Championship in cadets and juniors.She also won silver medal at the 2020 European U23 Championships in Porec, Croatia.

In January 2021, she was named female athlete of the year by the Croatian Olympic Committee. In the same month, she competed in the women's 78 kg event at the 2021 Judo World Masters held in Doha, Qatar. In February, she won the bronze medal at 2021 Judo Grand Slam Tel Aviv in Tel Aviv, Israel. In March, she won the silver medal in her event at the 2021 Judo Grand Slam Tashkent held in Tashkent, Uzbekistan. In June, she was eliminated in her second match in the women's 78 kg event at the 2021 World Judo Championships held in Budapest, Hungary.

Achievements

References

External links
 

Living people
1998 births
Sportspeople from Split, Croatia
Croatian female judoka
Judoka at the 2019 European Games
European Games competitors for Croatia
Judoka at the 2020 Summer Olympics
Olympic judoka of Croatia
21st-century Croatian women